The Kabyle Wikipedia is the Kabyle language edition of Wikipedia. Launched in April 2007, It currently has  articles, making it the 186th largest Wikipedia by article count. This Wikipedia has 3 administrators along with 13,671 registered users and 25 active users.

History 
Kabyle Wikipedia was started in 14 April 2007.

References

External links

 Kabyle Wikipedia
 Kabyle  Wikipedia mobile

Wikipedias by language
Wikipedias in Berber languages
Internet properties established in 2007